The Rugby League European Championship C, formerly the European Bowl, is an international European rugby league football tournament organised by the Rugby League European Federation for third tier rugby league nations.

History
It was first contested in 2008, with the proposed participating teams being Estonia, Latvia and Ukraine. In 2020, it was announced promotion and relegation would be introduced with three teams in each division, with the top team being promoted and the bottom relegated.

Results

Championship era (2008–2019)

Promotion and relegation era (2020–present)

Summary

See also

 Rugby League European Championship A
 Rugby League European Championship B
 Rugby League European Championship D
 Women's Rugby League European Championship
 Wheelchair Rugby League European Championship

References

European Bowl
Rugby league international tournaments